Possible Conscription Acts:

United Kingdom 
 Military Service Act (United Kingdom)

United States 
 Militia Act of 1792
 Enrollment Act of 1863